Devotion is the second studio album by American dream pop duo Beach House. It was released on February 26, 2008, by Carpark Records in North America, Bella Union in Europe, and Mistletone Records in Australia. Written in the early months of 2007, it was recorded at Lord Baltimore Recording Studio within two months. The album was released to mostly positive reviews from music critics and is their first album to enter the Billboard 200 chart, debuting at number 195, selling roughly 3,000 copies upon its release. As of April 2012 Devotion has sold 49,000 copies in United States according to Nielsen Soundscan.

Regarding the album's title, lead vocalist and keyboardist Victoria Legrand reflected ten years after the album's release: "We called it Devotion for a reason. That was part of the story, and it’s part of our union. It felt like we were chasing something together. Two dreamers, together in a dreamworld."

Composition 
Drowned in Sound said the album has "the sound of atrophied romance, obscure regrets and flickering confetti set to a shoegaze siren call that brought to mind the likes of Mazzy Star and Slowdive whilst gently asserting a hushed authority all of its own," further stating that the "funereal organ and sparse, chintzy beats remain, but the sound is more fleshed-out and vivid with harpsichord and lushly textured keys, Alex Scally's slide guitar in particular more languidly expressive than ever." Slant Magazine stated the duo are "the Gillian Welch and David Rawlings of folktronica, dream pop, or whatever", adding that the album is "mostly quiet strumming, jangling percussion, and busy, elegiac keyboards."

According to AllMusic, "You Came to Me" is a "stunner, melding dark chamber pop ambience with lyrics that feel like they came from a surreal '70s AM radio hit." "Heart of Chambers" is "downright soulful, with Legrand's keening voice and swelling organs giving it a truly devotional cast". "Some Things Last a Long Time" is an "aptly torchy, country-tinged ballad about carrying a torch for someone". It is a cover of the Daniel Johnston song from his eleventh studio album, 1990. "Astronaut" "pines for a crush to be requited, filtering the innocence and drama of girl group pop through the band's gauzy approach."

Critical reception 

Devotion received mostly positive reviews from music critics. At Metacritic, which assigns a normalized rating out of 100 to reviews from mainstream critics, the album received an average score of 73, based on 29 reviews, indicating "generally favorable reviews". Brian Howe of Pitchfork said "the duo's songwriting hasn't fundamentally changed on Devotion; they've simply cleaned up their act. These are crisper, brighter, bolder songs, retaining Beach House's sense of elegant decay while sweeping up the debris." Drowned in Sound said the album "resonates with the same formless essence as its predecessor, but also far exceeds it in both composition and execution," further stating that the band "have created as profound an invocation of the sacred and the sentimental as you’re ever likely to hear." Slant Magazine praised the album, saying "it's possible to believe that if this band ever tires of killing with quietness and powerful beauty, they have it in them to dabble further in noise and space-rock. For now, though, holding back is working pretty damn well," as well as praising Legrand's vocal performance: "Where previously Legrand's vocals occasionally faltered or got lost in the mix of sped-up shoegaze, here she of the many Nico comparisons is comfortably out front. In fact, Legrand's vocal performance on Devotion is as masterful a one as you’re likely to hear in 2008." AllMusic stated the duo "bring more focus, depth, and warmth to their unmistakable sound" compared to their debut, as well as saying the band's "dark moods have more shades, and even a little bit of light, making them all the more compelling." With a positive review, Rolling Stone stated: "As comfortable as the Beach House sound is, it's the uncomfortable moments that are most seductive."

Accolades 
Tiny Mix Tapes listed the album at number 6 on their top albums of 2008. No Ripcord ranked it at number 27, The A.V. Club at number 30 and Pitchfork at number 46. Rolling Stone included the album at number 36 in their "The 40 Greatest Stoner Albums" list, saying the album "was the perfect deep-toking soundtrack for late-'00s indie kids: a drifty, velveteen set full of homemade charm, gauzy keyboards and hypnotic tunes."

Track listing

Personnel
Credits adapted from the album's liner notes.

Beach House
Victoria Legrand – keyboard, organ, vocals
Alex Scally – guitar, drum, organ, four-track

Additional musicians
Ben McConnell – drums (tracks 2, 9, 11), percussion (tracks 1, 2, 5, 6, 9, 11)
Dave Andler – drums (track 10)
Rob Girardi – Echoplex (track 11)

Production
Rob Girardi – mixing, recording
Adam Cooke – mixing, recording
Alan Douches – mastering
Natasha Tylea – photography

Charts

References

External links
 Obscure Sound feature of Devotion

2008 albums
Beach House albums
Carpark Records albums